Lazar Tešanović was a Serbian schoolteacher and military officer. He was a reserve lieutenant of Royal Yugoslav Army and, later, the Chetniks military officer during World War II.

World War II 
During the War, Tešanović founded the Obilić Detachment which operated between two rivers, Vrbas and Vrbanja, and south to mount Vlašić. Detachment took a main part in the Lipovac ambush on the Partisans Company led by Mladen Stojanović, who was badly wounded in the fight.

On 23 May 1942, Tešanović entered into an agreement with the Independent State of Croatia, asking arms and ammunition to fight against the Partisans. In addition, he has collaborated with the Nazi Germans.

On 8 July 1943, Obilić Detachment has become a part of the Middle-Bosnian Chetniks Corps and Tešanović became commander of that corps.

See also 
 Mile Mećava
 Mladen Stojanović

References

1947 deaths
Royal Yugoslav Army personnel of World War II
People from Kneževo, Bosnia and Herzegovina
Serbian people of World War II
Serbian collaborators with Nazi Germany
Serbian anti-communists
Chetnik personnel of World War II
Serbs of Bosnia and Herzegovina